(born 8 October 1956) is an archer from Japan, who was born in Hyogo, Japan.

He competed for Japan in the 1976 Summer Olympics held in Montreal, Quebec, Canada in the individual event where he finished in second place behind American Darrell Pace .

References
Sports-reference

1956 births
Japanese male archers
Olympic archers of Japan
Olympic silver medalists for Japan
Archers at the 1976 Summer Olympics
Living people
Olympic medalists in archery
Medalists at the 1976 Summer Olympics
20th-century Japanese people